John Keating may refer to:

Politics
 John Keating (Australian politician) (1872–1940), Australian politician
 John Keating (Irish politician) (1869–1956), Irish National League / Cumann na nGaedhael / Fine Gael politician from Wexford

Others
 John Keating (judge) (1630–1691), Irish judge who became Chief Justice of the Irish Common Pleas
 John Keating (land developer) (1760–1853), Irish-born soldier in the French army
 John Keating (sportscaster) (born c. 1957), US sportscaster
 John D'Arcy Keating (born 1952), Canadian former professional ice hockey player
 John Richard Keating (1934–1998), American clergyman of the Roman Catholic Church
 Johnny Keating (1927–2015), Scottish musician
 Seán Keating (1889–1977), Irish painter, President of the Royal Hibernian Academy

Fictional characters
 John Keating, character in Dead Poets Society
 John Keating, character in Teachers (UK TV series)